Ganaderos, representing the province of Camagüey, won the 15th Cuban National Series with a five-game cushion over Metropolitanos.

Standings

References

 (Note - text is printed in a white font on a white background, depending on browser used.)

Cuban National Series seasons
Base
Base
1976 in baseball